The following is a list of massacres that have occurred in Latvia (numbers may be approximate):

Latvia
Massacres

Massacres